Phillip Ranson Hancock (born October 30, 1953) is an American professional golfer who formerly played on the PGA Tour.

Early life 
Hancock learned to play golf growing up in Greenville, Alabama from his father, a local dentist.  Hancock and his friends would often play 45 or 54 holes in the summer time.  He won his first tournament at the 1969 Alabama State Junior Championship at age 16.

College career 
After high school, Hancock accepted an athletic scholarship to attend the University of Florida in Gainesville, Florida, where he played for coach Buster Bishop's Florida Gators men's golf team in National Collegiate Athletic Association (NCAA) competition from 1973 to 1976.  During his freshman year, the Gators golf team, which included future PGA Tour members Andy Bean, Gary Koch and Woody Blackburn, won the 1973 NCAA Championship.  As a Gator golfer, Hancock received All-SEC honors for four consecutive years (second-team in 1973 and 1974; first-team in 1975 and 1976), and was an All-American in 1974, 1975 and 1976.  He won the SEC individual championship in 1975 and 1976, and was the winner of the Haskins Award in 1976.  He graduated from the University of Florida with a bachelor's degree in public relations in 1976, and was inducted into the University of Florida Athletic Hall of Fame as a "Gator Great" in 1992.

Professional career 
Hancock turned professional in 1976 and played briefly in Europe his first year, after failing to earn a spot on the PGA Tour by a single stroke in qualifying school.  He joined the PGA Tour the following year.  Hancock played full-time on the PGA Tour from 1977 to 1985; his career was plagued by long absences due to back ailments.  After leaving the tour, he has held various teaching and club professional jobs in Florida and Alabama.

Hancock lives in Montgomery, Alabama, and works as a club and teaching professional at Indian Pines Golf Course in Auburn, Alabama.

Amateur wins 
1969 Alabama State Junior Championship
1975 SEC Championship (individual)
1976 SEC Championship (individual)

Professional wins (4)

PGA Tour wins (1)

Other wins (3)
1977 Colombian Open
1981 Melitta Classic-Bell's Cup (Brazil)
1984 Chrysler Team Championship (with Ron Streck)

Results in major championships

Note: Hancock never played in The Open Championship.

CUT = missed the half-way cut
"T" indicates a tie for a place

U.S. national team appearances
PGA Cup: 1990 (winners)

See also 

Spring 1977 PGA Tour Qualifying School graduates
List of Florida Gators men's golfers on the PGA Tour
List of University of Florida alumni
List of University of Florida Athletic Hall of Fame members

References

External links 

American male golfers
Florida Gators men's golfers
PGA Tour golfers
Golfers from Alabama
People from Greenville, Alabama
Sportspeople from Montgomery, Alabama
1953 births
Living people